The 2015 General Cup was a professional non-ranking snooker tournament that took place between 16 and 21 November 2015 at the General Snooker Club in Hong Kong.

Ali Carter was the defending champion but he withdrew from the tournament. Kyren Wilson withdrew as well and they were replaced by Michael Holt and Mark Davis.

Zhang Anda won the General Cup Qualifying Event. Anda beat Cao Yupeng 5–4 in the final. This was an invitational event with the winner receiving the final place in the General Cup.

Marco Fu beat Mark Williams 7–3 in the final, making 3 centuries while doing so.

Prize fund
The breakdown of prize money for this year is shown below:
 Winner: $120,000
 Runner-up: $60,000
 Semi-final: $40,000
 Third in group: $25,000
 Fourth in group: $20,000
 Per century break: $2,000
 Highest break: $20,000

Round robin stage
The top two players from both groups will qualify for the knock-out stage. All group matches being held between 16 and 19 November 2015 and is the best of 7 frames.

Group A

 Martin Gould 4–3 Zhang Anda
 Joe Perry 2–4 Zhang Anda
 Michael White 4–0 Martin Gould
 Joe Perry 4–1 Martin Gould
 Michael White 2–4 Zhang Anda
 Joe Perry 2–4 Michael White

Group B

 Marco Fu 4–0 Mark Williams
 Marco Fu 1–4 Mark Davis
 Mark Williams 4–0 Michael Holt
 Mark Davis 1–4 Michael Holt
 Mark Williams 4–1 Mark Davis
 Marco Fu 4–2 Michael Holt

Knock-out stage

Century breaks
 136, 128, 124, 119, 111, 101  Marco Fu
 136, 135  Martin Gould
 109, 107, 104  Mark Davis
 108  Michael White

Notes

References

2015
2015 in snooker
2015 in Hong Kong sport